Indian Summer is an album by Carbon Leaf, released on July 13, 2004 on Vanguard Records. Carbon Leaf's first major-label release, Indian Summer brought the band more popular attention and national radio airplay. Some songs from this album were re-recorded for the movie Curious George 2: Follow That Monkey.

Track listing

Charts
Singles

Indian Summer Revisited

Indian Summer Revisited is an album by Carbon Leaf released on August 9, 2014, on their Constant Ivy Music label. It is a re-recording of the album for its tenth anniversary. While their former record label, Vanguard Records, owns the master recordings for the album, the band owns the songs through their publishing company and label, Constant Ivy Music. The album was funded via the crowdfunding website Pledge Music.

While the original album featured original drummer Scott Milstead and longtime bassist Jordan Medas, the re-recorded album features Jason Neal, who joined the band in 2007, on drums and Jon Markel, who joined the band in 2008, on bass.

Track listing

References

External links
 Review by George Graham (broadcast on WVIA-FM 2004-08-11)

2004 albums
Carbon Leaf albums